"No Candle No Light" is a song by English singer and songwriter  Zayn featuring American rapper and singer Nicki Minaj. It was released on 15 November 2018 by RCA Records, as the sixth and final single from his second studio album Icarus Falls (2018).

Background and release
On 14 November 2018, Zayn shared on Twitter a teaser for the song with only the word "Thursday" spelled out on the screen and Minaj's signature "Young Money" in the background.

Music
The Fader called the song a "tropical house bop" and compared its synths to those in "Sorry" by Justin Bieber. Rolling Stone called the track an EDM-pop exploration of "romantic frustration". Exclaim! noted the song's "booming EDM beat with Zayn's trademark emotional croon", and pointed out that Minaj sings instead of rapping.

Cover art
Complex noted the song's "cigarette-assisted cover art", which shows Malik holding a cigarette to his mouth.

Credits and personnel
 Zayn – vocals, songwriting
 Nicki Minaj – vocals 
 Tushar Apte – songwriting, production, record engineering
 Brittany "Chi" Coney – songwriting
 Brian Lee – songwriting, production, record engineering
 Kathryn Osterberg – songwriting
 Sawyr – songwriting, production, record engineering
 Denisia "Blu June" Andrews – songwriting
 Aubry "Big Juice" Delaine – mixing engineering
 Iván Jiménez – record engineering assistance
 David Nakaji – record engineering assistance
 Brian Judd – record engineering assistance
 Nick Valentin – record engineering assistance
 Jaycen Joshua – mixing engineering

Charts

Release history

References

2018 singles
2018 songs
Zayn Malik songs
Nicki Minaj songs
Songs written by Zayn Malik
Songs written by Nicki Minaj
Songs written by Brian Lee (songwriter)
Songs written by Tushar Apte
British electronic dance music songs
British pop songs
Tropical house songs
RCA Records singles